Melvin Van Peebles (born Melvin Peebles; August 21, 1932 – September 21, 2021) was an American actor, filmmaker, writer, and composer. He worked as an active filmmaker into the 2000s. His feature film debut, The Story of a Three-Day Pass (1967), was based on his own French-language novel  and was shot in France, as it was difficult for a black American director to get work at the time. The film won an award at the San Francisco International Film Festival which gained him the interest of Hollywood studios, leading to his American feature debut Watermelon Man, in 1970. Eschewing further overtures from Hollywood, he used the successes he had so far to bankroll his work as an independent filmmaker.

In 1971, he released his best-known work, creating and starring in the film Sweet Sweetback's Baadasssss Song, considered one of the earliest and best-regarded examples of the blaxploitation genre. He followed this up with the musical, Don't Play Us Cheap, based on his own stage play, and continued to make films, write novels and stage plays in English and in French through the next several decades; his final films include the French-language film  (2000) and the absurdist film Confessionsofa Ex-Doofus-ItchyFooted Mutha (2008). His son, filmmaker and actor Mario Van Peebles, appeared in several of his works and portrayed him in the 2003 biographical film Baadasssss!.

Early life and education
Born Melvin Peebles in Chicago, Illinois, he was the son of Edwin Griffin and Marion Peebles. In 1953, Melvin graduated with a B.A. in literature from Ohio Wesleyan University and, 13 days later, joined the Air Force, serving for three and a half years. He added "Van" to his name when he lived in the Netherlands in his late 20s.

Career

Early years
He worked as a cable car gripman in San Francisco, California. Later, he wrote about these experiences. His first book, The Big Heart, credited to Melvin Van, evolved from a small article and a series of photographs taken by Ruth Bernhard.

According to Van Peebles, a passenger suggested that he should become a filmmaker. Van Peebles shot his first short film, Pickup Men for Herrick in 1957 and made two more short films during the same period. About these films, Van Peebles said: "I thought they were features. Each one turned out to be eleven minutes long. I was trying to do features. I knew nothing." As he learned more about the filmmaking process, he found out that "I could make a feature for five hundred dollars. That was the cost of 90 minutes of film. I didn't know a thing about shooting a film sixteen to one or ten to one or none of that shit. Then I forgot you had to develop film. And I didn't know you needed a work print. All I can say is that after I did one thing he would say, 'Well, aren't you gonna put sound on it?' and I would go, 'Oh shit!' That's all I could say."

After Van Peebles completed his first short films, he took them with him to Hollywood to try to find work, but was unable to find anyone who wanted to hire him as a director. Van Peebles decided to move his family to the Netherlands where he planned to study astronomy. On the way to Europe, in New York City, he met Amos Vogel, founder of the avant-garde Cinema 16 who agreed to place two of Van Peebles's shorts in his rental catalog. Vogel screened Van Peebles's Three Pickup Men for Herrick at Cinema 16 on a program with City of Jazz in the spring of 1960 with Ralph Ellison leading a post-film discussion.

Meanwhile, in the Netherlands, Van Peebles's marriage dissolved and his wife and children went back to the United States. In France, Van Peebles created the short film  (500 Francs) (1961) and then established himself as a writer. He did investigative reporting for France Observateur during 1963–64, during which he profiled, and later became friends with, Chester Himes. Himes got him a job at the anti-authoritarian humor magazine Hara-kiri, where Van Peebles wrote a monthly column and eventually joined the editorial board.

1965–1970
During 1965–66, Mad magazine attempted a French edition and hired Van Peebles as editor-in-chief during its run of only five issues. He began to write plays in French, utilizing the sprechgesang form of songwriting, where the lyrics were spoken over the music. This style carried over to Van Peebles' debut album, Brer Soul.

Van Peebles was a prolific writer in France. He published four novels and a collection of short stories. He completed at least one play,  which was also released as a novel, and which he would later make into the musical Don't Play Us Cheap. Van Peebles made his first feature-length film, The Story of a Three-Day Pass (1968) based on a novel by the same title. The film caught the attention of Hollywood producers who mistook him for a French auteur after it won an award at the San Francisco International Film Festival as the French entry. Van Peebles's first Hollywood film was the 1970 Columbia Pictures comedy Watermelon Man, written by Herman Raucher. Starring Godfrey Cambridge, the movie tells the story of a casually racist white man who suddenly wakes up black and finds himself alienated from his friends, family, and job.

1970–1995
In 1970, Van Peebles directed  filming of the Powder Ridge Rock Festival, which was banned by court injunction. After Watermelon Man, Van Peebles became determined to have complete control over his next production, which became the groundbreaking Sweet Sweetback's Baadasssss Song (1971), privately funded with his own money, and in part by a $50,000 loan from Bill Cosby. Van Peebles not only directed, scripted, and edited the film, but wrote the score and directed the marketing campaign. The film, which in the end grossed $15 million, was, among many others, acclaimed by the Black Panthers for its political resonance with the black struggle. His son Mario's 2003 film BAADASSSSS! tells the story behind the making of Sweet Sweetback's Baadasssss Song; father and son presented the film together as the Closing Night selection for Maryland Film Festival 2004.

Van Peebles wrote the book, music, and lyrics for the stage musical Ain't Supposed to Die a Natural Death, which opened off-Broadway and then moved to Broadway, running for 325 performances in 1971–72. The show was nominated for seven Tony Awards, including Best Musical, Best Book of a Musical, and Best Original Score. As his intended follow-up to Sweet Sweetback's Baadasssss Song, Van Peebles made the musical film Don't Play Us Cheap. However, he was unable to find a distributor, so he ended up producing a stage adaptation of the film. Van Peebles performed the same duties as his previous stage musical, as well as producing and directing. The show ran for 164 performances in 1972, earning Van Peebles another Tony nomination for Best Book of a Musical. The previously shot film version was later released on January 1, 1973.

In 1977, Van Peebles was one of four credited screenwriters on the film Greased Lightning, about the life of pioneering Black NASCAR driver Wendell Scott. He was originally the director of the film as well, but was replaced by Michael Schultz.

Van Peebles was involved with two more Broadway musicals in the 1980s. He was a co-writer on the book for Reggae, which closed after 21 performances in 1980. For Waltz of the Stork, he wrote book, music, and lyrics, as well as producing the show and playing the lead role. It ran for 160 performances in 1982.

In the 1980s, Van Peebles became an options trader on the American Stock Exchange while continuing to work in theater and film.

In 1995, he co-starred in the American live-action version of Japanese manga Fist of the North Star, alongside Gary Daniels, Costas Mandylor, Chris Penn, Isako Washio, Malcolm McDowell, Downtown Julie Brown, Dante Basco, Tracey Walter, Clint Howard, Tony Halme, and Big Van Vader.

2005–2009
In 2005, Van Peebles was the subject of a documentary entitled How to Eat Your Watermelon in White Company (and Enjoy It). Also in 2005, Van Peebles was the subject of the documentary Unstoppable: Conversation with Melvin Van Peebles, Gordon Parks, and Ossie Davis, which also featured Ossie Davis and Gordon Parks in the same room. It was moderated by Warrington Hudlin.

In 2005, it was announced that Van Peebles would collaborate with Madlib for a proposed double album titled Brer Soul Meets Quasimoto. However, nothing further was issued about this project from the time that it was first announced.

In 2008, Van Peebles completed the film Confessionsofa Ex-Doofus-ItchyFooted Mutha, which was the Closing Night selection for Maryland Film Festival 2008, and appeared on All My Children as Melvin Woods, the father of Samuel Woods, a character portrayed by his son, Mario.

In 2009, Van Peebles became involved with a project to adapt Sweet Sweetback into a musical. A preliminary version of this was staged at the Apollo Theater on April 25–26, 2009. As well, he wrote and performed in a stage musical, Unmitigated Truth: Life, a Lavatory, Loves, and Ladies, which featured some of his previous songs as well as some new material.

2011–2019
In 2011, Van Peebles started doing shows in NYC with members of Burnt Sugar, under the name Melvin Van Peebles wid Laxative. Van Peebles said that the band is called Laxative because they "make shit happen". In November 2011, Melvin Van Peebles wid Laxative performed his song "Love, That's America" at Zebulon Cafe Concert, two weeks after the venue showed the original video for this song involving Occupy Wall Street footage, which was uploaded to YouTube in October 2011.

On August 21, 2012, he distributed a new album, on vinyl only, called Nahh... Nahh Mofo. This album was distributed at his birthday celebration at Film Forum. On November 10, 2012, he released a video for the song "Lilly Done the Zampoughi Every Time I Pulled Her Coattail" to go with the album, which was announced on his Facebook page.

On May 5, 2013, he returned to the Film Forum for a screening of Charlie Chaplin's The Kid (1921) and was a judge at the Charlie Chaplin Dress-Alike Contest which was held after the screening. He wore a bowler hat and baggy pants in honor of Chaplin.

In September 2013, Van Peebles made his public debut as a visual artist, as a part of a gallery featured called "eMerge 2.0: Melvin Van Peebles & Artists on the Cusp". It features "Ex-Voto Monochrome (A Ghetto Mother's Prayer)", one of many pieces of art he created to be on display in his home.

In 2017, Methane Momma, a short film directed by Alain Rimbert, featured Van Peebles and his narration of poetic work with accompaniment of music by The Heliocentrics.

In 2019, Burnt Sugar presented the film Sweetback in Brooklyn while playing their own interpretation of the soundtrack. Van Peebles appeared at the presentation.

Personal life
Melvin Van Peebles married a German woman, Maria Marx. They lived in Mexico for a period in the late 1950s, where he painted portraits. Their son, actor and director Mario Van Peebles, was born while they resided in Mexico. The family subsequently returned to the United States.

Van Peebles died on September 21, 2021, at his home in Manhattan, New York, at the age of 89. He is survived by his sons, Mario and Max, and his daughter Marguerite.

Awards and honors 

1967: Critics' Choice Award for The Story of a Three-Day Pass. San Francisco Film Festival.
1972: Most Promising Book, Winner for Ain't Supposed to Die a Natural Death. Drama Desk Awards.
1972: Best Score from an Original Cast Album, two nominations for Ain't Supposed to Die a Natural Death. 15th Annual Grammy Awards.
1972: Best Book of a Musical and Best Original Score, two nominations for Ain't Supposed to Die a Natural Death, 26th Tony Awards.
1973: Best Book of a Musical, nomination for Don't Play Us Cheap, 27th Tony Awards.
1976: Black Filmmakers Hall of Fame
1994: Honorary doctorate of humane letters, Hofstra University 
1999: Lifetime Achievement Award. 6th Annual Chicago Underground Film Festival.
2001: Commander of the Legion of Honour (French Legion of Honour)
2008: Tribute Award from the Independent Filmmaker Project (IFP) and the Museum of Modern Art (MoMA). Gotham Awards.
2021: The "Melvin Van Peebles Trailblazer Award," was named in honor of Van Peebles at the Critics Choice Association's fourth annual Celebration of Black Cinema & Television.
2022: Honoree, 2nd Annual Attorney Benjamin Crump Equal Justice Now Awards

Bibliography
 (As "Melvin Van") The Big Heart, San Francisco: Fearon, 1957. With photographs by Ruth Bernhard, a book about life on San Francisco's cable cars. "A cable car is a big heart with people for blood. The people pump  on and off—if you think of it like that it is pretty simple" (p. 21).
  (1964); A Bear for the F.B.I., Trident, 1968.
  (1965); The True American, Doubleday, 1976.
 La Reine des Pommes (1965); French translation and illustrations for a graphic novel adaptation of Chester Himes' A Rage in Harlem .  
  (1966) (short stories)
  (Harlem Party) (1967) (novel)
  (1967)
 Sweet Sweetback's Baadasssss Song, Lancer Books, New York, 1971.
 Ain't Supposed to Die a Natural Death, Bantam, New York, 1973.
 Don't Play Us Cheap: A Harlem Party, Bantam Books, New York, 1973.
 Just an Old Sweet Song, Ballantine, New York, 1976.
 Bold Money: A New Way to Play the Options Market, Warner Books, New York, 1986,  (nonfiction)
 Melvin and Mario Van Peebles: No Identity Crisis, A Fireside Book, Simon & Schuster, New York, 1990.
 Panther, Thunder's Mouth Press, 1995.
 Introduction to the 1998 edition of Chester Himes' Yesterday Will Make You Cry, 1997.
Confessions of a Ex Doofus Itchy Footed Mutha, New York: Akashic Books, 2009, ISBN 9781933354866. With illustrations by Caktuz Tree, a graphic novel adaptation of the film with the same title.

Filmography

Music videos 

 "Lilly Done the Zampoughi Every Time I Pulled Her Coattail"

Other writing credits 
 Sweet Sweetback's Baadasssss Song: The Musical (2008) writer, singer
 Unmitigated Truth: Life, a Lavatory, Loves, and Ladies (2009) writer, performer

As himself 
 Unstoppable (2005)
 How to Eat Your Watermelon in White Company (2005)

Other acting-only credits 
 O.C. and Stiggs (1987) as Bob 'Wino Bob'
 Jaws: The Revenge (1987) as Mr. Witherspoon
 Taking Care of Terrific (1987) (television film) as 'Hawk'
 Sonny Spoon (1988) (television series) as Mel Spoon
 Boomerang (1992) as Editor
 Posse (1993) as Joe 'Papa Joe'
 Terminal Velocity (1994) as Noble
 Fist of the North Star (1995) as Asher
 Living Single (1996) as Warner Devant
 The Shining (1997) (miniseries) as Dick Hallorann
 The Hebrew Hammer (2003) as Sweetback
 BlacKout (2007) as George
 Redemption Road (2010) as Elmo
 We the Party (2012) as 'Big D'
 Peeples (2013) as Grandpa Peebles
 Armed (2018) as Grandpa V

Plays

 The Hostage (Dutch National Theatre Tour, actor, writer, 1964)
 Ain't Supposed to Die a Natural Death (writer, 1971)
 Don't Play Us Cheap (writer, 1972)
 Out There by Your Lonesome (one-man play, 1973)
 Reggae (co-librettist, 1980)
 Waltz of the Stork (actor, writer, 1982)
 Champeen (musical, writer, 1983)
Waltz of the Stork Boogie (writer, director, 1984)
Unmitigated Truth: Life, a Lavatory, Loves, and Ladies (musical, writer, 2009)

Discography

Studio albums 
 Brer Soul (1968)
 Ain't Supposed to Die a Natural Death (1970)
 As Serious as a Heart-Attack (1971)
 What the....You Mean I Can't Sing?! (1974)
 Ghetto Gothic (1995)
 Nahh... Nahh Mofo (2012)
 The Last Transmission (2014, with The Heliocentrics)

Compilations 
 X-Rated By an All-White Jury (1997) – including Brer Soul, Ain't Supposed to Die a Natural Death and As Serious as a Heart-Attack

Soundtrack albums 
 Watermelon Man (1970)
 Sweet Sweetback's Baadasssss Song (1971)
 Ain't Supposed to Die a Natural Death (1972)
 Don't Play Us Cheap (1972)

See also
Works by Melvin Van Peebles

References

Further reading
 Chaffin-Quiray, Garrett. "Great Directors: Melvin Van Peebles". Senses of Cinema Issue 25 (March 21, 2003).
 Greasley, Philip A. The Authors. Bloomington: Indiana University Press, 2001. Print. 
 Owusu, Kwesi, "Melvin Van Peebles inspired the first Black cinema House in Europe | The Electric Cinema, Portobello Road, London", Kwesinews. Retrieved March 10, 2023.

External links
 
 
 
 

1932 births
2021 deaths
20th-century African-American writers
20th-century American dramatists and playwrights
20th-century American male writers
20th-century American novelists
21st-century African-American people
A&M Records artists
African-American dramatists and playwrights
African-American film directors
African-American male actors
African-American male writers
African-American novelists
American derivatives traders
American expatriates in France
American expatriates in Mexico
American experimental filmmakers
American male actors
American male dramatists and playwrights
American male novelists
Atlantic Records artists
Blaxploitation film directors
Capitol Records artists
Chevaliers of the Légion d'honneur
Film directors from Illinois
Novelists from Illinois
Ohio Wesleyan University alumni
Stax Records artists
United States Air Force airmen
Writers from Chicago